Bojan Dubajić (born 1 September 1990) is a Serbian professional footballer who plays as a forward for Cypriot club  Enosis Neon Paralimni.

Career
On 7 January 2021, Kazakhstan Premier League club Aktobe announced the signing of Dubajić. Six months later, after 15 appearances and 3 goals, Dubajić left Aktobe.

References

1990 births
Living people
Footballers from Novi Sad
Serbian footballers
Association football forwards
Serbian expatriate footballers
Expatriate footballers in Switzerland
Expatriate footballers in Thailand
Expatriate footballers in Belarus
Expatriate footballers in Kazakhstan
Expatriate footballers in Cyprus
Serbian SuperLiga players
Swiss Challenge League players
Bojan Dubajic
Belarusian Premier League players
Kazakhstan Premier League players
FK Inđija players
FK Radnički Sombor players
FC Lugano players
FC Le Mont players
Bojan Dubajic
FC Gorodeya players
FC BATE Borisov players
FC Aktobe players
Enosis Neon Paralimni FC players